

Keilira is a locality located within the Kingston District Council in the Limestone Coast region of South Australia.

Demographics
The median age of persons in Keilira was 39 years. There were equal amount of males and females, with 50% of the population male and female. The average household size was 2.7 people per household.

References

Limestone Coast
Towns in South Australia